The Southern Mongolian Democratic Alliance was created in May 1992, by Hada and other Mongol activists including Tegexi. Its major goal is the self-determination of Inner Mongolia (an autonomous region of China).

Historical background
In the 1980s, Temtselt Shobshuud, Huchuntegus, Wang Manglai and Hada, all students at universities in Hohhot, discussed establishment of the Inner Mongolian People's Party (IMPP), a political party for Mongolians in Inner Mongolia. Later, individuals from eastern and western Inner Mongolia divided and therefore, Huchuntegus established the Ordos Association of Ethnic Culture at the Ikh Juu League (now the Ordos City). Hada established the Southern Mongolian Democratic Alliance. Xi Haiming fled his country and established the IMPP in New York, in March, 1997.

The Southern Mongolian Democratic Alliance organization was  originally named "Mongolian Culture Rescue Committee" and Hada was elected chairman. In 1994, this group created a journal: Voice of Southern Mongolia, and in 1995 initiated a constitution outlining the Alliance's main mission as “opposing colonization by the Han people and striving for self-determination, freedom and democracy in Southern [Inner] Mongolia.” Voice of Southern Mongolia, was banned in 1995, and it is still banned nowadays.

See also
Inner Mongolian People's Party
Inner Mongolia
Outer Mongolia
Mongolia
Inner Mongolian independence movement

Notes

External links
Campaign for the release of Hada (smhric.org)
Inner Mongolia
Banned political parties in China
Banned secessionist parties
Political parties established in 1992
Inner Mongolian independence movement